The Matale rebellion, also known as the Rebellion of 1848, took place in Matale city,  Ceylon against the British colonial government under Governor George Byng, 7th Viscount Torrington. It marked a transition from the classic feudal form of anti-colonial revolt to modern independence struggles. It was fundamentally a peasant revolt.

Background
The Kandyan provinces were in a state of turmoil. They had been under British rule for 32 years. Under the Crown Lands (Encroachments) Ordinance No. 12 of 1840 (sometimes called the Crown Lands Ordinance or the Waste Lands Ordinance), European planters had expropriated the common land of the peasantry and reduced them to penury. In the 1830s, coffee was introduced into Ceylon, a crop which flourishes in high altitudes, and grown on the land taken from the peasants. The principal impetus to this development was the decline in coffee production in the West Indies, following the abolition of slavery there.

However, the dispossessed peasantry were not employed on the plantations: The Kandyan villagers refused to abandon their traditional subsistence holdings and become wage-workers in the nightmarish conditions that prevailed on these new estates, despite all the pressure exerted by the colonial state. The British therefore had to draw on its reserve army of labour in India, to man its lucrative new outpost to the south. An infamous system of contract labour was established, which transported hundreds of thousands of Tamil 'coolies' from southern India into Sri Lanka for the coffee estates. These Tamils labourers died in tens of thousands both on the journey itself as well as on the plantations.

An economic depression in the United Kingdom had severely affected the local coffee and cinnamon industry. Planters and merchants clamoured for a reduction of export duties. Sir James Emerson Tennent, the Colonial Secretary in Colombo recommended to Earl Grey, Secretary of State for the Colonies in London that taxation should be radically shifted from indirect taxation to direct taxation, which proposal was accepted. It was decided to abolish the export duty on coffee and reduce the export duty on cinnamon leaving a deficit of £40,000 Sterling which was to be met by direct taxes on the people. A new Governor, 35-year-old Lord Torrington, a cousin of Prime Minister Lord Russell was dispatched to Colombo by Queen Victoria to carry out these reforms.

On 1 July 1848, license fees were imposed on guns, dogs, carts, shops and labour was made compulsory on plantation roads, unless a special tax was paid. These taxes bore heavily not only on the purse but also on the traditions of the Kandyan peasant. A mass movement against the oppressive taxes was developing. The masses were without the leadership of their native King (deposed in 1815) or their chiefs (either crushed after the Uva Rebellion or collaborating with the colonial power). The leadership passed for the first time in the Kandyan provinces into the hands of ordinary people.

Rebellion
On 26 July 1848, the leaders and the supporters entered the historic Dambulla Vihara and at 11.30 a.m., Gongalegoda Banda was consecrated by the head monk of Dambulla, Ven. Giranegama Thera. Gongalegoda Banda was called "Sri Wickrama Subha Sarva Siddhi Rajasinghe". He asked the people whether they were on the side of the Buddhists or the British. On the same day Dines, his brother was declared the sub-king and Dingirala as the uncrowned king of the Sat Korale (Seven Counties). Veera Puran Appu was appointed prime minister and the sword bearer to Gongalegoda Banda and attended his consecration ceremony with 4000 others.

After the proclamation of the king, he with his army left Dambulla via Matale to capture Kandy from the British. They attacked government buildings including the Matale Kachcheri and destroyed some of the tax records. Simultaneously, Dingirirala instigated attacks in Kurunegala, where eight people were killed by the British. Governor Lord Torrington immediately declared martial law on 29 July 1848 in Kandy and on 31 July in Kurunegala.

Puran Appu was taken prisoner by the British troops and was executed on 8 August. Gongalegoda Banda and his younger brother Dines escaped and went into hiding. Gongalegoda Banda lived in a cave at Elkaduwa,  from Matale. Torrington issued a warrant for his arrest with a reward of £150 for information on his whereabouts. On 21 September, he was arrested by Malay soldiers — although he offered resistance before his arrest - and was brought from Matale to Kandy where he was kept a prisoner.

The trial of Gongalegoda Banda commenced on 27 November at the Supreme Court sessions in Kandy. He was charged with high treason for claiming to be King of Kandy and waging war against the British. He declared that he was guilty of all the charges. The Supreme Court condemned him to be hanged on 1 January 1849.

Subsequently, a proclamation was issued to amend the death sentence to flogging 100 times and deportation to Malacca (Malaysia). Puran Appu, even though his leg of the rebellion was successful in capturing Matale, and was proclaimed as the King of Sinhale by people, was eventually captured, taken to Kandy and executed.

Leaders
The Matale Rebellion was led by leaders such as, Paranagama Nilame, Swarnapali Paranagama Kumarihami (daughter of Paranagama nilame ), Suriyabandara Nilame (King Of Mathale) (Son), Gongalegoda Banda, Dines, Dingi Rala and Puran Appu who were supported by the people and the village headmen of Matale. These were workers with links to the low country, with rather broader vision than the Kandyan peasants they led.

Gongalegoda Banda
Gongalegoda Banda, the son of Wansapurna Dewage Sinchia Fernando was the leader of the 1848 Rebellion and King of Kandy. He had been employed by the police and came to reside at Gongalegoda, Udunuwara where he became a popular figure among the Kandyans. He was seen at the Temple of the Tooth just before the 1848 Rebellion broke out. Gongalegoda Banda led a protest march regarding unjustifiable taxes on 6 July 1848, near the Kandy Kachcheri.

Veera Puran Appu
Weerahennedige Francisco Fernando alias Veera Puran Appu is one of the most colourful personalities in Sri Lanka's history. He was born in November 1812 in the coastal town of Moratuwa. He left Moratuwa at the age of 13 and stayed in Ratnapura with his uncle, who was the first Sinhalese proctor, and moved to the Uva Province. In early 1847, he met and married Bandaramenike, the daughter of Gunnepana Arachchi in Kandy.

Legacy

The Matale Rebellion was the first transitional step towards abandoning the feudal form of revolt, being fundamentally a peasant revolt. The masses were without the leadership of their native King (deposed in 1815), or their chiefs (either crushed after the Uva Rebellion or collaborating with the colonial power). The leadership passed for the first time in the Kandyan provinces into the hands of ordinary people. The leaders were yeomen-artisans, resembling the Levellers in England's revolution, and mechanics such as Paul Revere and Tom Paine who were at the heart of the American Revolution. The old feudalists were crushed and powerless. No new class capable of leading the struggle and heading it towards power had yet arisen.

See also
 Fort MacDowall
 Great Rebellion of 1817–18
 Revolutions of 1848

References

Tyronne Fernando, Veera Puran Appu: stood up against the might of British Empire accessed 5 December 2005.
Dr. K. D. G. Wimalaratne, Director, National Archives, Gongale Goda Banda (1809-1849) : The leader of the 1848 rebellion accessed 5 December 2005.
Fred Halliday, The 1971 Ceylonese Insurrection accessed 5 December 2005.
Colvin R. de Silva, Hartal! accessed 5 December 2005.

External links
Matale rebellion remembered

Sri Lankan independence movement
Military history of Sri Lanka
Wars involving Sri Lanka
Rebellions in Asia
19th-century military history of the United Kingdom
Conflicts in 1848
British Ceylon
19th-century rebellions
History of Kandy
1848 in Ceylon
Peasant revolts